Wayne McCarney  is an Australian cyclist. He won the bronze medal in Men's team pursuit in the 1988 Summer Olympics.

References 

Living people
1966 births
Cyclists at the 1988 Summer Olympics
Olympic cyclists of Australia
Olympic bronze medalists for Australia
Australian male cyclists
Olympic medalists in cycling
Medalists at the 1988 Summer Olympics
Commonwealth Games medallists in cycling
Commonwealth Games gold medallists for Australia
Australian track cyclists
Cyclists at the 1986 Commonwealth Games
20th-century Australian people
21st-century Australian people
Medallists at the 1986 Commonwealth Games